Horace Wilson (February 10, 1843 – March 4, 1927) was an American expatriate educator in late 19th century Empire of Japan. He is one of the persons credited with introducing the sport of baseball to Japan.

Biography
Wilson was born in Gorham, Maine. He enrolled at Kents Hill School in the fall 1858, and is believed to have graduated in the spring of 1862. A veteran of the U.S. Civil War, he fought for the 12th Maine Volunteer Infantry Regiment against the Confederates in Louisiana.  

After the war, he was hired by the Japanese government as a foreign adviser to assist in the modernization of the Japanese education system after the Meiji Restoration. He served as a professor of English at  Kaisei Gakko, the forerunner of Tokyo Imperial University.

In either 1872 or 1873, Wilson decided that his students needed more physical exercise, and introduced them to the sport of baseball. Several weeks or months later, enough interest had developed for the school to sponsor a seven-inning game between the Japanese students and foreign instructors. The first formal baseball team was established in 1878.

Wilson returned to the United States in 1877 and lived in San Francisco. He died in 1927 at age 84.  Wilson was posthumously elected to membership in the Japanese Baseball Hall of Fame by the special committee in 2003.

See also

 Japanese baseball

References

External links
 Baseball In Japan
The Japanese Baseball Hall of Fame and Museum (English)

Foreign advisors to the government in Meiji-period Japan
Foreign educators in Japan
American expatriates in Japan
People from Gorham, Maine
1843 births
1927 deaths
Burials at Cypress Lawn Memorial Park
Japanese Baseball Hall of Fame inductees